Alissa White-Gluz (born 31 July 1985) is a Canadian singer, best known as the lead vocalist of the Swedish melodic death metal band Arch Enemy, and former lead vocalist and founding member of the Canadian metalcore band the Agonist. Her vocal style includes both growling and clean vocals (singing). Although primarily associated with melodic death metal and metalcore, she has appeared as a guest vocalist for power metal, symphonic metal and deathcore bands, notably Kamelot, Delain, Carnifex and Powerwolf, and has performed live with Nightwish and Tarja Turunen.

Early life
White-Gluz was born in Montreal, Quebec, Canada, as the second of three children. Her grandparents were prisoners in concentration camps during World War II and managed to escape. Their experiences in the camps would go on to inspire the Arch Enemy song "First Day in Hell". She is the younger sister of Jasamine White-Gluz who leads the Montreal-based band No Joy.

Career

The Agonist (2004–2014)

In 2004, White-Gluz formed the Agonist (then known as "Tempest") with fellow band members Danny Marino and Chris Kells in Montreal, Quebec, Canada. She released three albums with them as their lead vocalist. White-Gluz left the Agonist in the spring of 2014 after she was offered the role as vocalist for Arch Enemy.

Arch Enemy (2014–present)

On 17 March 2014, Arch Enemy announced via press release that Alissa would be replacing their former vocalist Angela Gossow. With Arch Enemy, she has released three studio albums (War Eternal, Will to Power and Deceivers) and two live albums (Tokyo Sacrifice and As The Stages Burn!)

Solo career

White-Gluz signed a deal with Napalm Records in 2016 to release a solo album entitled Alissa. In a 2017 interview with Duke TV, she announced that her album would feature collaborations with Kamelot members, and said that the sound of the album would be "pretty different" from that of Arch Enemy.

Guest vocal work
White-Gluz has recorded guest vocals for Blackguard's 2008 EP Another Round, as well as for Slaves on Dope's 2012 album Over the Influence.

White-Gluz has worked with Kamelot on a number of occasions. In September and October 2012, she was a guest vocalist for Kamelot when they were the supporting act for Nightwish's North American tour. In February 2015, Kamelot announced that she would contribute guest vocals to their Haven album.

At the Denver show on 28 September 2012, White-Gluz and Elize Ryd performed the Nightwish lead vocals live on stage with minimal preparation after Anette Olzon was taken ill. White-Gluz, Ryd and Tommy Karevik later joined Nightwish (now fronted by Floor Jansen) on stage again to sing the final song of the tour, "Last Ride of the Day", in Orlando on 14 October 2012. Arch Enemy, with White-Gluz as lead vocalist, joined Nightwish as a supporting act on their 2015 European tour.

In February 2014, the Dutch symphonic metal band Delain announced that White-Gluz would be contributing guest vocals to their fourth studio album The Human Contradiction. White-Gluz made a second guest appearance with Delain in 2016 on "Hands of Gold", the opening track of their fifth studio album Moonbathers.

In 2017, White-Gluz recorded guest vocals for Doyle Wolfgang von Frankenstein's band, DOYLE. She appears on the band's second album, DOYLE II, on the track "Kiss Me As We Die", providing background vocals. White-Gluz and Doyle Wolfgang von Frankenstein have been in a relationship since 2014.

In 2018, White-Gluz recorded guest vocals for Angra's album Omni, which was released in February 2018. She appears on the third track "Black Widow's Web" alongside Brazilian singer Sandy. She also contributed to Dee Snider's album For The Love of Metal on the track Dead Hearts Love Thy Enemy and Kane Robert's/Alice Cooper's Beginning of the End. She provided guest vocals for Soilwork on the song "Stålfågel", which is part of their eleventh studio album Verkligheten. The album was released on 11 January 2019.

White-Gluz recorded guests vocals for the American deathcore act, Carnifex on the song "No Light Shall Save Us", which is on the band's seventh studio album, World War X, which was released on 2 August 2019 through Nuclear Blast Records.

In 2019, White-Gluz appeared on the album Anesthetic by Mark Morton (Lamb of God) as a guest vocalist on the song "The Truth Is Dead" along with Randy Blythe (Lamb of God). The song was also released as a single in 2018.

In June 2021, Powerwolf released a remix of their famous "Demons Are a Girl's Best Friend" with White-Gluz as the lead vocalist.

In 2022, White-Gluz recorded guest vocals for the video game Metal: Hellsinger and published a song with Nita Strauss called "The Wolf You Feed".

Other media
White-Gluz is appearing in visual companion content to American Murder Song as Pretty Lavinia. Her character was first revealed at Steampunk World's Fair and has since been released on American Murder Song's YouTube channel.

In addition to her music career, White-Gluz also had a voice acting stint where she voiced the Swarm Hunters in Gears 5.

Personal life
White-Gluz has been in a relationship with Doyle Wolfgang von Frankenstein since 2014, the guitarist of American horror punk band Misfits.

She was raised in a family of vegetarians, and has been a vegan since 1998. She follows a straight-edge lifestyle. She identifies as an atheist and considers herself opposed to religion, though she noted that "it doesn’t mean [she hates] religious people or [is] opposed to them".

Interests
White-Gluz is a fan of classical music as well as rock music. She enjoys 1990s grunge music such as Nirvana, Stone Temple Pilots, and Soundgarden. "I know a lot of people hate it but I love the simplicity, the stripped-down, honest songs and the mistakes. On Nirvana’s live album for example I love hearing the fuck-ups, out-of-tune guitars and the cracks in the voice", White-Gluz said in an interview with Metal Hammer.

Activism
In a 2018 interview with Metal Hammer, White-Gluz said she had been "vegan for about 18 years", but that she had engaged in animal rights activism since childhood. She received a Libby award from PETA for her work in an international campaign advocating against the hunting of Canadian seals. In 2023, she posed as a mermaid in a PETA anti-fishing ad campaign.

Discography

The Agonist
2007 – Once Only Imagined
2009 – Lullabies for the Dormant Mind
2011 – The Escape (EP)
2012 – Prisoners

Arch Enemy
2014 – War Eternal 
2017 – As the Stages Burn!
2017 – Will to Power
2019 – Covered in Blood
2022 – Deceivers

Guest appearances
Powerwolf on track "demon`s girl`s best friend"
Never More Than Less – on track "So Beautiful" – Album Relentless (2008, Le Collectif Artcore)
(the) Plasmarifle – on track "From The Trail of Ashes..." – Album While You Were Sleeping The World Changed in an Instant (October 2008 Siege of Amida Records)
Blackguard – on track "The Sword" – Album Profugus Mortis (April 2009 Sumerian Records)
Kamelot – on track "Sacrimony (Angel of Afterlife)" – Album Silverthorn (October 2012 SPV/Steamhammer, King)
Delain – on track "The Tragedy of the Commons" – Album The Human Contradiction (April 2014 Napalm Records)
Kamelot – on tracks "Liar Liar (Wasteland Monarchy)" and "Revolution" – Album Haven (February 2015 Napalm Records)
Metal Allegiance – guest vocals on "We Rock" – Album Metal Allegiance (2015, Nuclear Blast)
Karmaflow – as the Muse in "The Muse and the Conductor" (2015)
Caliban – on track "The Ocean's Heart" – Album Gravity (March 2016, Century Media)
And Then She Came – on track "Five Billion Lies" – Album And Then She Came (June 2016 DME Music Napalm Records)
Tarja Turunen – on track "Demons in You" – Album The Shadow Self (August 2016, earMUSIC)
Delain – guest vocals on "Hands of Gold" – Album Moonbathers (August 2016 Napalm Records)
Metal Allegiance – guest vocals on "Life in the Fast Lane" – Album Fallen Heroes (2016, Nuclear Blast)
Evesdroppers – guest vocals on "God's Ocean" – Album Empty Vessel, (2016, Casual Madness)
American Murder Song – as Pretty Lavinia (2016)
Aurelio Voltaire – on track "Leaves in the Stream" – Album Heart-Shaped Wound, (2017)
Angra – on track "Black Widow's Web" – Album ØMNI (2018)
Dee Snider – on track "Dead Hearts (Love Thy Enemy)" – Album For the Love of Metal (2018, Napalm Records)
Soilwork – on track "Stålfågel" – Album Verkligheten (2019, Nuclear Blast)
Mark Morton – on track "The Truth Is Dead" (w/ Randy Blythe of Lamb of God) – Album Anesthetic (2019, Spinefarm)
Carnifex – on track "No Light Shall Save Us" – Album World War X (2019, Nuclear Blast)
Kane Roberts – on track "Beginning of the End" – Album The New Normal, (2019, Frontiers Records)
Babymetal – on track "Distortion" – Album Metal Galaxy (2019)
Kamelot – on live album "I Am the Empire – Live from the 013" (2020, Napalm Records)
Charlotte Wessels – on single "Lizzie" (2020, collaboration)
Me and That Man – on track "Goodbye" – Album New Man, New Songs, Same Shit, Vol.2 (2021, Napalm Records)
Nita Strauss – on track "The Wolf You Feed" (2022)
Metal: Hellsinger - on track "Stygia" (2022)

References

External links

1985 births
Living people
Activists from Montreal
Anglophone Quebec people
Canadian atheists
Canadian women environmentalists
Canadian feminists
Canadian expatriates in Sweden
Canadian women heavy metal singers
Canadian human rights activists
Women human rights activists
Canadian people of Lithuanian descent
Canadian people of Jewish descent
Canadian women singer-songwriters
Jewish Canadian musicians
Arch Enemy members
Canadian LGBT rights activists
Singers from Montreal
Jewish atheists
Jewish heavy metal musicians
21st-century Canadian women singers
Women in metal